Baku Convention Center is a multifunction complex located close to the City centre of Baku. It is the largest congress center in the Caucasus.

With a number of flexible conference rooms, as well as a large hall with a maximum capacity of up to 3,500 seats, the Congress Center offers opportunities for holding congresses, conferences, seminars, business meetings, concerts and other activities. The congress center has 17 conference halls with a total capacity of up to 2,500 people. Besides conference halls and an auditorium, there are rooms for meetings and workshops.

Construction 

Construction of Baku Convention Center began in February, 2014 and completed in 2015. The Center covers a total area of 6,2 ha. The area of 46,600 square meters of the Center is under construction.

The Center building includes 17 conference halls with total capacity of 2,500 people, a restaurant that can serve 1,500 guests, administrative and other rooms. The center is supplied with a 405 square meter monitor, in the lobby of the building and more than 50 monitors in different places. The auditorium can also be used for electro acoustical performances and presentations. Office wing and the media center are located on the upper floor, services rooms are on the ground floor.

Opening ceremony  
The opening ceremony of Baku Convention Center was held on 29 April 2015 with participation of President Ilham Aliyev, his wife Mehriban Aliyeva and daughter ArzuAliyeva. Finance Minister Samir Sharifov gave information about the building.

The first international event that Baku Convention Center hosted on May 2-5 was the 48th annual meeting of the Board of Directors of the Asian Development Bank.

Events

48th annual meeting of the Board of Directors of the Asian Development Bank 
On May 2-5 2015 the 48th annual meeting of the Board of Directors of the Asian Development Bank was held in Baku Convention Center. Over 3,000 participants including government officials, business leaders, academics, journalists, and representatives from different countries and organizations attended the event.

Second Academic Forum of UNESCO Chairs 
The Second Academic Forum of UNESCO Chairs on intercultural and inter-religious dialogue, which was co-organized by UNESCO and the Government of Azerbaijan, was held in Baku Convention Center on the occasion of the 4th World Forum on Intercultural Dialogue on May 4, 2017. The opening speech of the Forum was made by UNESCO’s Assistant Director-General for Social and Human Sciences Nada Al-Nashif. 14 UNESCO Chairs from around the globe attended the forum. The purpose of this forum was to identify ways of positive impact of the chairs on strengthening the relationship between research and policy development.

41st World Scout Conference 
Baku Convention Center hosted the 41st World Scout Conference on August 15, 2017. More than 1500 participants attended the conference. The conference touched upon issues related to the further development of intelligence organizations and the strategy of their activities, as well as elections to the administrative bodies of the organization.

18th Mid-Term Ministerial Conference of the Non-Aligned Movement (NAM) 

18th Mid-Term Ministerial Conference of the Non-Aligned Movement (NAM) titled “Promoting international peace security for sustainable development" has been held at Baku Convention Center between 3-6 April

Project team  
The project was designed by Coop Himmelb(l)au Wolf D. Prix & Partner ZT GmbH. Project leader is Christian Labud, Günther Weber, architect is Martin Jelinek, design architect is Alexander Ott, coordinators are Maria Nardelli, Donna Riedel.

References

External links 

 Baku Convention Center 
Official Website 

Buildings and structures in Baku
Culture in Baku
Tourist attractions in Baku